10cc are an English rock band formed in Stockport in 1972. The group initially consisted of four musicians – Graham Gouldman, Eric Stewart, Kevin Godley and Lol Creme – who had written and recorded together since 1968. The group featured two songwriting teams. Stewart and Gouldman were predominantly pop songwriters, who created most of the band's accessible songs. Godley and Creme were the predominantly experimental half of 10cc, featuring art and cinematically inspired writing.

Every member of 10cc was a multi-instrumentalist, singer, writer and producer. Most of the band's records were recorded at their own Strawberry Studios (North) in Stockport and Strawberry Studios (South) in Dorking, with most of those engineered by Stewart.

From 1972 to 1978, 10cc had five consecutive UK top-ten albums: Sheet Music (1974), The Original Soundtrack (1975), How Dare You! (1976), Deceptive Bends (1977) and Bloody Tourists (1978). 10cc also had twelve singles reach the UK Top 40, three of which were the chart-toppers "Rubber Bullets" (1973), "I'm Not in Love" (1975) and "Dreadlock Holiday" (1978). "I'm Not in Love" was their breakthrough worldwide hit and is known for its innovative backing track. Godley and Creme quit the band in 1976 due to artistic disagreements and became a duo act. Stewart left the band in 1995. Since 1999, Gouldman has led a touring version of 10cc.

First collaborations
Three of the founding members of 10cc were childhood friends in the Manchester area. As boys, Godley and Creme knew each other; Gouldman and Godley attended the same secondary school and their musical enthusiasm led to playing at the local Jewish Lads' Brigade.

1964–1969: Early bands
Their first recorded collaboration was in 1964, when Gouldman's band The Whirlwinds recorded the Lol Creme composition "Baby Not Like You", as the B-side of their only single, "Look At Me". The Whirlwinds then changed members and name, becoming The Mockingbirds (including singer-guitarist Gouldman, bassist Bernard Basso and drummer Kevin Godley, formerly of The Sabres with Creme). The Mockingbirds recorded five singles in 1965–66 without any success, before dissolving. The guitarist in both The Whirlwinds and The Mockingbirds was Stephen Jacobson, brother of well-known writer Howard Jacobson.

In June 1967, Godley and Creme reunited and recorded a solitary single ("Seeing Things Green" b/w "Easy Life" on UK CBS) under the name "The Yellow Bellow Room Boom". In 1969, Gouldman took them to a Marmalade Records recording session. The boss, Giorgio Gomelsky, was impressed with Godley's falsetto voice and offered them a recording contract. In September 1969, Godley & Creme recorded some basic tracks at Strawberry Studios, with Stewart on guitar and Gouldman on bass. The song, "I'm Beside Myself" b/w "Animal Song", was issued as a single, credited to Frabjoy and Runcible Spoon.

Gomelsky (an ex-manager of The Yardbirds) planned to market Godley & Creme as a duo, in the vein of Simon & Garfunkel. Plans for an album by Frabjoy and Runcible Spoon faltered, however, when Marmalade ran out of funds. Solo tracks by Godley and Gouldman, however - both involved Stewart and Creme – were released on a 1969 Marmalade Records compilation album, 100 Proof. Gouldman's track was "The Late Mr. Late"; a year later, Godley's song "To Fly Away" reappeared as "Fly Away", in the debut Hotlegs album, Thinks: School Stinks.

Gouldman, meanwhile, had made a name for himself as a hit songwriter, penning "Heart Full of Soul", "Evil Hearted You" and "For Your Love" for The Yardbirds, "Look Through Any Window" and "Bus Stop" for The Hollies and "No Milk Today", "East West" and "Listen People" for Herman's Hermits.

1965–1968: The Mindbenders
Meanwhile, the fourth future member of 10cc was also tasting significant pop music success: guitarist Eric Stewart was a member of Wayne Fontana and the Mindbenders, a group that hit No.1 with "The Game of Love", and scored a number of other mid-1960s hits. When Fontana left the band in October 1965, the group became known simply as The Mindbenders, with Stewart as their lead vocalist. The band scored a hit with "A Groovy Kind of Love" (released December 1965) and made an appearance in the 1967 film To Sir, with Love with "It's Getting Harder All the Time" and "Off and Running."

In March 1968, Gouldman joined Stewart in The Mindbenders, replacing bassist Bob Lang and playing on some tour dates. Gouldman wrote two of the band's last three singles, "Schoolgirl" (released November 1967) and "Uncle Joe the Ice Cream Man" (August 1968). Those singles did not chart and The Mindbenders broke up after a short tour of England in November.

1968–1970: Birth of Strawberry Studios; the bubblegum era
In the dying days of The Mindbenders, Stewart began recording demos of new material at Inner City Studios, a Stockport studio then owned by Peter Tattersall, a former road manager for Billy J. Kramer and the Dakotas. In July 1968, Stewart joined Tattersall as a partner in the studio, where he could further hone his skills as a recording engineer. In October 1968, the studio was moved to bigger premises and renamed Strawberry Studios, after The Beatles' "Strawberry Fields Forever".

In 1969, Gouldman also began using Strawberry to record demos of songs he was writing for Marmalade. He had become much more in demand as a songwriter than as a performer. By the end of the year, he too was a financial partner in the studios.

By 1969, all four members of the original 10cc line-up were working together regularly at Strawberry Studios. Around the same time, noted American bubblegum pop writer-producers Jerry Kasenetz and Jeffry Katz of Super K Productions came to England and commissioned Gouldman to write and produce formulaic bubblegum songs, many of which were recorded at Strawberry Studios, and were either augmented or performed entirely by varying combinations of the future 10cc line-up.

Among the recordings from this period was "Sausalito", a No. 86 US hit credited to Ohio Express and released in July 1969. In fact the song featured Gouldman on lead vocal, and vocal and instrumental backing by the other three future 10cc members.

In December 1969, Kasenetz and Katz agreed to a proposal by Gouldman that he work solely at Strawberry, rather than move constantly between Stockport, London and New York. Gouldman convinced the pair that these throwaway two-minute songs could all be written, performed and produced by him and his three colleagues, Stewart, Godley and Creme, at a fraction of the cost of hiring outside session musicians. Kasenetz and Katz booked the studio for three months.

Kevin Godley recalled:We did a lot of tracks in a very short time – it was really like a machine. Twenty tracks in about two weeks – a lot of crap really – really shit. We used to do the voices, everything – it saved 'em money. We even did the female backing vocals.
The three-month project resulted in a number of tracks that appeared under various band names owned by Kasenetz-Katz, including "There Ain't No Umbopo" by Crazy Elephant, "When He Comes" by Fighter Squadron and "Come on Plane" by Silver Fleet (all three with lead vocals by Godley), and "Susan's Tuba" by Freddie and the Dreamers (which was a monster hit in France and featured lead vocals by Freddie Garrity, despite claims by some that it was Gouldman).

Lol Creme remembered: "Singles kept coming out under strange names that had really been recorded by us. I've no idea how many there were, or what happened to them all."

But Stewart described the Kasenetz-Katz deal as a breakthrough: "That allowed us to get the extra equipment to turn it into a real studio. To begin with they were interested in Graham's songwriting and when they heard that he was involved in a studio I think they thought the most economical thing for them to do would be to book his studio and then put him to work there – but they ended up recording Graham's songs and then some of Kevin and Lol's songs, and we were all working together."

1970–1971: Hotlegs; Doctor Father; The New Wave Band; Festival
When the three-month production deal with Kasenetz-Katz ended, Gouldman returned to New York to work as a staff songwriter for Super K Productions and the remaining three continued to dabble in the studio.

With Gouldman absent, Godley, Creme and Stewart continued recording singles. The first, "Neanderthal Man", released under the name Hotlegs, began life as a test of drum layering at the new Strawberry Studios mixing desk, but when released as a single by Fontana Records in July 1970, climbed to No. 2 in the UK charts and became a worldwide hit, selling more than two million copies. Around the same time, the trio released "Umbopo" under the name of Doctor Father. The song, a slower, longer and more melancholic version of the track earlier released under the name of Crazy Elephant, failed to chart.

Reverting to the successful band name Hotlegs, in early 1971 Godley, Creme and Stewart recorded the album Thinks: School Stinks, which included "Neanderthal Man". They then recalled Gouldman for a short tour supporting The Moody Blues, before releasing a follow-up single "Lady Sadie" b/w (Backed With) "The Loser". Philips Records reworked their sole album, removed "Neanderthal Man" and added "Today" and issued it as Song. Stewart, Creme and Godley released another single in February 1971 under yet another name, The New Wave Band, this time with former Herman's Hermits member Derek "Lek" Leckenby on guitar. The song, a cover version of Paul Simon's "Cecilia", was one of the few tracks the band released that they had not written. It also failed to chart.

The band also continued outside production work at Strawberry, working with Dave Berry, Wayne Fontana, Peter Cowap and Herman's Hermits, and doing original compositions for various UK football (soccer) teams. In 1971 they produced and played on Space Hymns, an album by New Age musician Ramases; in 1972–73 they co-produced and played on two Neil Sedaka albums, Solitaire and The Tra-La Days Are Over.

The experience of working on Solitaire, which became a success for Sedaka, was enough to prompt the band to seek recognition on their own merits. Gouldman—who by 1972 was back at Strawberry Studios—said:

Stewart said the decision was made over a meal in a Chinese restaurant: "We asked ourselves whether we shouldn't pool our creative talents and try to do something with the songs that each of us was working on at the time."

Once again a four-piece, the group re-recorded Hotlegs track "Today" b/w new Stewart/Gouldman song "Warm Me" and released it under the name Festival. The single failed to chart and the band moved on to record a Stewart/Gouldman song, "Waterfall", in early 1972. Stewart offered the acetate to Apple Records. He waited months before receiving a note from the label saying the song was not commercial enough to release as a single.

1972–1976: Original line-up
Undeterred by Apple's rejection, the group decided to plug another song which had been written as a possible B-side to "Waterfall", a Godley/Creme composition titled "Donna". The song was a Frank Zappa-influenced 1950s doo-wop parody, a sharp mix of commercial pop and irony with a chorus sung in falsetto. Stewart said: "We knew it had something. We only knew of one person who was mad enough to release it, and that was Jonathan King." Stewart called King, who drove to Strawberry, listened to the track and "fell about laughing", declaring: "It's fabulous, it's a hit."

King signed the band to his UK Records label in July 1972 and dubbed them 10cc. By his own account, King chose the name after having a dream in which he was standing in front of the Hammersmith Odeon in London where the boarding read "10cc The Best Band in the World". A widely repeated claim, disputed by King and Godley, but confirmed in a 1988 interview by Creme, and also on the webpage of Gouldman's current line-up is that the band name represented ten cubic centimetres, a volume of semen that was more than the average amount ejaculated, thus emphasising their potency or prowess.

"Donna", released as the first 10cc single, was chosen by BBC Radio 1 disc jockey Tony Blackburn as his Record of the Week, helping to launch it into the Top 30. The song peaked at No. 2 in the UK in October 1972.

Although their second single, a similarly 1950s-influenced song called "Johnny Don't Do It", was not a major chart success, "Rubber Bullets", a catchy satirical take on the "Jailhouse Rock" concept, became a hit internationally and gave 10cc their first British No.1 single in June 1973. They consolidated their success a few months later with "The Dean and I", which peaked at No.10 in September. They released two singles, "Headline Hustler" (in the US) and the self-mocking "The Worst Band in the World" (in the UK) and launched a UK tour on 26 August 1973, joined by second drummer Paul Burgess, before returning to Strawberry Studios in November to record the remainder of their second LP, Sheet Music (1974), which included "The Worst Band in the World" along with other hits "The Wall Street Shuffle" (No.10, 1974) and "Silly Love" (No.24, 1974). Sheet Music became the band's breakthrough album, remaining on the UK charts for six months and paving the way for a US tour in February 1974.

In February 1975, the band announced they were splitting with Jonathan King and that they had signed with Mercury Records for US$1 million. The catalyst for the deal was one song – "I'm Not in Love". Stewart recalled:At that point in time we were still on Jonathan King's label, but struggling. We were absolutely skint, the lot of us, we were really struggling seriously, and Philips Phonogram wanted to do a deal with us. They wanted to buy Jonathan's contract. Our manager Ric Dixon invited them to listen to what we've done. Head of A & R Nigel Grainge came up to our Strawberry Studio, heard the album and freaked. He said "This is a masterpiece, it's a done deal!". We did a five-year deal with them for five albums and they paid us a serious amount of money. It was Grainge's idea to release 'Life Is A Minestrone' as the first single holding back the big one to give us more longevity for the album.

Speaking in the BBC Four documentary I'm Not in Love: The Story of 10cc in 2015, Stewart explained that the band, three years into a five-year contract with King were earning a mere 4% of royalties. Creme made it clear that the band had fully intended to sign with Richard Branson's fledgling Virgin label, with the band's records to be released in the US through Atlantic. Stewart and Creme were about to go on holiday with their wives (Stewart and Creme are brothers-in-law through marriage), however, and had left their manager Harvey Lisberg with power of attorney to accept the Branson offer. No sooner had they left the country, but another higher bid arrived from Phonogram and was accepted by the management team, including Lisberg. Creme said that he felt "horrified, embarrassed and disgusted - to this day I still am".

The Original Soundtrack, which was already complete, was released just weeks later. It was both a critical and commercial success and featured distinctive cover art created by the Hipgnosis team and drawn by musician and artist Humphrey Ocean. It is also notable for its opening track, Godley & Creme's "Une Nuit A Paris (One Night in Paris)", an eight-minute, multi-part "mini-operetta" that is thought to have been an influence on "Bohemian Rhapsody" by Queen.

Although it bore an unlikely title (picked up from a radio talk show), "Life Is a Minestrone" (1975) was another UK Top 10 placing, peaking at No.7. Their biggest success came with the dreamy "I'm Not in Love", which gave the band their second UK No. 1 in June 1975. The song provided them with their first US chart success when the song reached No. 2. A collaborative effort built around a title by Stewart, "I'm Not in Love" is notable for its innovative production, especially its richly overdubbed choral backing. Godley stated:If I was to pick one track from everything we've done, "I'm Not in Love" would be my favourite. It's got something that none of our other tracks have at all. It's not clever in a conscious way but it says it all so simply in, what, six minutes. – NME, February 1976
During this time 10cc also collaborated with Justin Hayward on the single "Blue Guitar", being a backing band and doing production work. The song was also released on later reissues of Blue Jays album by Hayward and John Lodge.

10cc's fourth LP, How Dare You! (1976), featuring another Hipgnosis cover, furnished two more UK Top Ten hits—the witty "Art for Art's Sake" (No.5 in January 1976) and "I'm Mandy, Fly Me" (No.6, April 1976). But by this time the once close personal and working relationships between the four members had begun to fray, and it was the last album with the original line-up.

10cc's success prompted the 1976 re-release of the Hotlegs album under the new title You Didn't Like It Because You Didn't Think of It with two additional tracks. The title track was the epic B-side of "Neanderthal Man", a section of which had been reworked as "Fresh Air for My Mama" on the 10cc album.

1976: Split
Frictions mounted between the group's two creative teams during the recording of How Dare You, with each pair realising how far apart their ideas had become. At the beginning of the sessions for band's fifth album further creative differences occurred and Godley and Creme left 10cc to work on a project that eventually evolved into the triple LP set Consequences (1977), a sprawling concept album that featured contributions from satirist Peter Cook and jazz vocalist Sarah Vaughan.

The first of a series of albums by Godley & Creme, Consequences began as a demonstration record for the "Gizmotron", an electric guitar effect they had invented. The device, which fitted over the bridge of an electric guitar, contained six small motor-driven wheels attached to small keys (four wheels for electric basses); when the key was depressed, the Gizmotron wheels bowed the guitar strings, producing notes and chords with endless sustain. First used during the recording of the Sheet Music track "Old Wild Men", the device was designed to further cut their recording costs: by using it on an electric guitar with studio effects, they could effectively simulate strings and other sounds, enabling them to dispense with expensive orchestral overdubs.

In a 2007 interview with the ProGGnosis—Progressive Rock & Fusion website, Godley explained: "We left because we no longer liked what Gouldman and Stewart were writing. We left because 10cc was becoming safe and predictable and we felt trapped."

But speaking to Uncut magazine 10 years earlier, he expressed regret about the band breaking up as they embarked on the Consequences project:

In a BBC Radio Wales interview Stewart gave his side of the split:

Stewart said there were immediate benefits in the absence of Godley and Creme. "It became clear things went much smoother and the atmosphere was much more pleasant than with Lol and Kevin," he said.

Godley & Creme went on to achieve cult success as a songwriting and recording duo, scoring several hits and releasing a string of innovative LPs and singles. Having honed their skills on the equally innovative clips that they made to promote their own singles (e.g. their 1985 single "Cry") they returned to their visual arts roots and became better-known as directors of music videos in the 1980s, creating acclaimed videos for chart-topping acts including George Harrison ("When We Was Fab"), Asia ("Heat of the Moment", "Only Time Will Tell") The Police ("Every Breath You Take"), Duran Duran ("Girls on Film"), Frankie Goes to Hollywood ("Two Tribes"), Peter Gabriel's duet with Kate Bush ("Don't Give Up"), and Herbie Hancock ("Rockit"). They also directed a video for Stewart and Gouldman's "Feel the Love".

1977–1983: Second era
After the departure of Godley and Creme, Stewart and Gouldman opted to continue as 10cc, working with drummer Paul Burgess, who had up to that point been their tour backup drummer. Their first album as a three piece band was Deceptive Bends (1977), named after a sign on the Mickleham bends on the A24 between Leatherhead and Dorking in Surrey. The album, recorded at the newly completed Strawberry South Studio in Dorking, Surrey, reached No. 3 in Britain and No. 31 in the US and also yielded three hit singles, "The Things We Do for Love" (UK No. 6, US No. 5), "Good Morning Judge" (UK No. 5, US No. 69) and "People in Love" (US No. 40). Stewart later said he and Gouldman felt vindicated by its success: "I was out to prove also that we could write a hit album without Kevin and Lol ... we did!"

In 1977, 10cc embarked on an international tour with guitarist Rick Fenn, keyboardist Tony O'Malley (Kokomo) and an additional drummer Stuart Tosh (ex-Pilot) and recorded a live album, "Live and Let Live" (1977), which mixed the hits with material by Stewart and Gouldman from 10cc's career (alongside two songs written with Godley and Creme).

Fenn, Tosh, Burgess and keyboardist Duncan Mackay, who replaced Tony O'Malley after the tour, were now full members of the band and performed on 1978's Bloody Tourists, which provided the band with their international No. 1 single, the reggae-styled "Dreadlock Holiday", also their third UK No. 1. Both Bloody Tourists and "Dreadlock Holiday" performed very successful around the world, however additional songs released as singles became only minor hits with the second UK single "Reds in My Bed", featuring lead vocals by Stuart Tosh, failing to chart.

The band suffered a major setback in January 1979 when Stewart was seriously injured in a car crash. Due to his injuries, Stewart was unable to work on music and 10cc had to be put on hold. This led to cancellation of 1979 legs of tour with other band members working on solo projects. Stewart later told the BBC:

Gouldman, too, considered the aftermath of Stewart's accident to be a turning point. In a 1995 BBC interview he said:

While Stewart recovered, Gouldman recorded the title track to the film Sunburn with the help of some of the 10cc band members, which became a minor UK hit in 1979. Gouldman also recorded the soundtrack to the animated film Animalympics, which was originally intended as 10cc project. Rick Fenn went onto large success touring with Mike Oldfield and recording with Nick Mason after being introduced by Eric Stewart while Duncan Mackay took part in recording of Kate Bush album Never for Ever.

To fill the gap between 10cc releases, a greatest hits compilation was issued in late 1979 Greatest Hits 1972–1978, and released a single, coupling "I'm Not in Love" with "For You and I", which failed to chart.

As Stewart recovered, he recorded the soundtrack to the film Girls, mainly working with Duncan Mackay with other 10cc band members making guest appearances.

The band signed with Warner Bros. Records, producing a new 10cc offering entitled Look Hear?. The lead single "One-Two-Five" failed to chart in the native UK and the album proved to be less successful than previous 10cc albums. In the aftermath of the tour in support Eric Stewart, Graham Gouldman and the rest of the band members again embarked on a number of side projects.

Gouldman and Stewart subsequently decided to continue 10cc as a duo with other members becoming session and touring musicians. The band returned to the Mercury label to record Ten Out of 10 (1981) featuring Fenn and Burgess on a number of tracks. The UK release of the album (and its associated singles "Les Nouveaux Riches" and "Don't Turn Me Away") failed to chart.

In a bid to inject an American flavour to the album and bolster its commercial appeal, Warner Bros. invited singer-songwriter Andrew Gold to contribute to a revised North American version of the LP. Gold wound up co-writing and playing on three new tracks which appeared on the North American release of Ten Out of 10. This ultimately led to an offer from Gouldman and Stewart to officially join 10cc; an offer Gold declined because of other commitments. Gouldman later admitted greater involvement by Gold might have lifted the band's early 1980s output from its mediocrity:

Despite the revisions to the album made for the North American market, Ten Out of 10 did not chart in US, nor did any singles pulled from the LP. However, the single "Don't Turn Me Away" was a surprise minor hit in Canada, reaching No. 38. Ironically, this track was one that appeared on the original "less commercial" UK version of the LP, and was not one of the tracks that had been specially added to the North American release.

The band embarked on their 10th anniversary tour in early 1982, with Fenn, Burgess and Tosh joining Stewart and Gouldman, along with new keyboardist Vic Emerson of Sad Café. They released "The Power of Love", co-written with Andrew Gold, as a single, which did not chart. "Run Away", released as a single in June 1982, reached No.50 in the UK; "We've Heard it all Before" (October 1982) did not chart. All three of these singles were tracks from the revised North American version of Ten Out of 10, and had not previously been issued in the UK.

Stewart also released a 1982 solo album, Frooty Rooties, with Burgess as a drummer and participation from Gouldman and Fenn on one track.

10cc began a UK tour in March 1983, coinciding with the release of the single "24 Hours". The song was made available both as a 7" and 10" single, with live versions of "Dreadlock Holiday" and "I'm Not in Love" on the b-sides. It failed to chart, as did a further single, "Feel The Love (Oomachasaooma)"/"She Gives Me Pain", issued in July 1983. "Feel The Love (Oomachasaooma)" was promoted by a tennis-themed video clip, directed by none other than former 10cc members Godley and Creme, by now well into their joint careers as noted music video pioneers.

The next 10cc LP, Windows in the Jungle, (October 1983) used session heavyweights including drummer Steve Gadd, but the album was dominated by Stewart; Gouldman only performed partial lead vocals on one song. It reached No.70 on the UK charts. The band toured the UK in October, with drummer Jamie Lane in place of Paul Burgess (who was working with Jethro Tull). This turned out to be their last tour until they reformed eight years later.

1984–1991: Separate projects
After 1983, the band went into recess as Stewart produced recordings for Sad Café and Gouldman produced tracks for the Ramones. Stewart continued his association with Paul McCartney; he had already appeared on Tug of War in 1982 and Pipes of Peace in 1983. During 1984 he appeared in the video for the US single "So Bad" which also featured Ringo Starr and the feature film/soundtrack for Give My Regards to Broad Street. He then co-wrote much of the Press to Play album (1986), though he was critical of the album's production. He also produced the album Eyes of a Woman (1985) by Agnetha Fältskog of ABBA.

Gouldman, meanwhile, teamed with Andrew Gold to form the duo Common Knowledge, which, after two unsuccessful singles changed their name to Wax. The duo's albums included Magnetic Heaven (1986), American English (1987) and A Hundred Thousand in Fresh Notes (1989). The duo scored some success including a Spanish No.1 single and their only British hit, "Bridge to Your Heart" (1987) which reached No. 12. Gouldman also assembled and produced the charity single "You'll Never Walk Alone" by The Crowd in aid of the Bradford City stadium fire. Released in 1985, the single reached No.1 in the UK charts.

A compilation album, Changing Faces – The Very Best of 10cc and Godley & Creme, was released in 1987 and gave the band their biggest hit album since 1978.

A four CD box set, Greatest Songs and More, was issued in Japan in 1991, which included many b-sides available on CD for the first time.

1991–1995: 10cc reunited
In 1991, the original four members reunited to record ...Meanwhile (1992), an album produced by Gary Katz of Steely Dan fame. Katz was suggested by the record label Polydor who wanted 10cc to enjoy success in America, and because of his links to Steely Dan—a similar-sounding 1970s band. However, the album was not a "reunion" in the strict sense of the word. All the album's songs were written by Stewart and Gouldman (with the exception of one track which was co-written by Stewart and Paul McCartney in the late 1980s with additional writing from Gouldman). Creme and Godley agreed to guest on the album to fulfil their obligation to Polydor—both had owed Polydor one album when they split in the late 1980s. Godley and Creme sang background vocals on several tracks on the album. Godley also sang the lead on one song, "The Stars Didn't Show". The record label did everything it could to make it appear that it was a genuine reunion album to generate publicity, but to little effect.

...Meanwhile did not spawn any major hits, but was relatively well received in Japan and in Europe. It prominently featured session musicians Jeff Porcaro of Toto on drums, Freddie Washington on bass, Michael Landau on lead and rhythm guitar, and Bashiri Johnson on percussion. Also appearing on the album were Dr. John (Mac Rebennack) on piano, David Paich (also of Toto fame) on keyboards, longtime 10cc collaborator Andrew Gold on guitar and many other renowned session musicians and singers. ...Meanwhile is believed to be Porcaro's last session work before he died of a heart attack. Dr. John was recommended by producer Gary Katz and invited along to the sessions.

Gouldman, in a 1995 interview, was philosophical about the album: "When we finally did come back to record again, it was based on market research that our record company had done, that said a new 10cc album would do really, really well. And, ah, history has proved that wrong." Yet according to Stewart, both he and Gouldman had approached the album positively. "We wrote in a three-month period, 22 songs. Every day we were coming up with new ideas, and they were getting better and better, as far as we were concerned. And they sounded like 10cc songs again."

The album was followed by a tour in 1993, with former members Rick Fenn and Stuart Tosh returning alongside new players Steve Piggot (keyboards, synthesisers) and Gary Wallis (drum, percussion). This tour was captured on the live album and DVD Alive.

In 1995 the band released Mirror Mirror, produced by Gouldman, Stewart and Adrian Lee of Mike + The Mechanics, and without participation from Godley or Creme. Despite initial objections by Gouldman, Mirror Mirror included an acoustic version of "I'm Not in Love" which became a No. 29 UK hit single, but overall the album did not fare very well. Gouldman has described Mirror Mirror as "almost like two-halves of an album", largely a result of the fact that he and Stewart recorded in separate countries. "I don't like to say we hoodwinked the people, but you could say it's not quite what it appears to be, and anyone with any sense, who reads the credits, could see that," he told Goldmine magazine. Their recording arrangement also provided further evidence of a fractured relationship between Stewart and Gouldman: aside from "I'm Not in Love", Stewart did not appear on any of the tracks Gouldman played or sang on, while Gouldman did not appear on any of Stewart's tracks.

In the spring of 1995, the band toured Europe and Japan with a line-up of Stewart, Gouldman, Fenn, Tosh, Alan Park (keyboards, synthesisers) and Geoff Dunn (drums, percussion).

Stewart left the band after this tour, and has since commented: "10cc is well and truly finished as far as I am concerned." Married to a pair of sisters, Stewart and Creme have kept in touch.

1999–present: 10cc touring band, GG/06
 
In 1999 Gouldman convened a 10cc line-up comprising himself, Fenn, Paul Burgess, and new recruits Mick Wilson (vocals, guitar) and Mike Stevens (vocals, keyboards, sax, guitar). This version of the band played their first gig at Ronnie Scott's Jazz Club in Birmingham and then began touring regularly in 2002. The same five members have been associated with the group ever since. A new member, Keith Hayman (keyboards), switched with Mike Stevens in 2006 and continued to do so until 2011. This iteration of the group also featured occasional guest appearances by Kevin Godley, and toured both the UK and overseas, playing 10cc hits plus a section of Gouldman's hits written for others. Wilson handled the majority of the lead vocals, taking over from Eric Stewart on that front. Although popular with audiences, Stewart is critical of the band continuing without him. Founding guitarist Lol Creme, discussing his newest live act in 2012, opined:

In January 2004, Godley and Gouldman reconvened to write more songs. Godley explained: 
In 2006  offered a six-track EP to download credited to GG/06: "The Same Road", "Johnny Hurts", "Beautifulloser.com", "Hooligan Crane", "Son of Man" and "Barry's Shoes", described as the first of a group of songs they had worked on for three years. A few of these songs were added to the rotation of songs that 10cc played in their live set, while the song "Son of Man" later became the opening theme for 10cc shows with Godley providing the video.

The band released a live album and DVD titled Clever Clogs in 2008 featuring Kevin Godley on several songs, including GG/06's "BeautifulLoser.com".

In early 2009, Gouldman's 10cc launched its official website, 10ccworld.com (now 10cc.world). Since the release, the website offered various live recordings of the shows through its online store. Regarding new 10cc studio release Gouldman has said that without Stewart, Creme or Godley, there will never be another 10cc album, though he is happy to play past albums in concert.

To celebrate the 40th anniversary of the band's formation 10cc performed a concert at the Royal Albert Hall on 10 May 2012 with Kevin Godley performing several songs with the band. Universal Music also issued two box sets for this occasion. The first one titled Tenology, a four-CD/one-DVD retrospective, was released on 19 November 2012. All four original members helped choose the track listing and gave interviews to Paul Lester as part of the project. The second box set titled Classic Album Selection featured albums from The Original Soundtrack to Live and Let Live along with bonus tracks.

In 2016, Godley recorded a video performance of "Somewhere in Hollywood" for 10cc's live performance of the album Sheet Music during that year. The same year Keith Hayman again replaced Mike Stevens on keyboards.

In December 2015, BBC Four released the hour-long documentary titled I'm Not in Love: The Story of 10cc.

In July 2017, a box set titled Before, During and After: The Story of 10cc was released. The four-disc set contains 10cc material as well as material from the late 60s and early 70s that the band recorded under various names and material from various projects that band members were involved in after leaving the band. Eric Stewart also released a solo boxset through Cherry Records while promoting his autobiography

In 2018 the 10cc concert line up changed with Iain Hornal taking Wilson's place as vocalist. Mick Wilson now sings and tours with 'Go Now - The Music of the Moody Blues' and also as part of 'Frontm3n' with Pete Lincoln (ex The Sweet) and Peter Howarth (The Hollies).

Personnel

Current members
 Graham Gouldman – bass guitar, lead and backing vocals, rhythm guitar, percussion (1972–1983, 1991–1995, 1999–present)
 Paul Burgess – drums, percussion, backing vocals, keyboards, vibraphone (touring member 1973–1976, 1976–1983, 1999–present)
 Rick Fenn – lead guitar, backing and lead vocals, bass guitar, keyboards (1976–1983, 1993–1995, 1999–present)
 Keith Hayman – keyboards, bass guitar, rhythm guitar, backing vocals (2006–2011, 2016–present)
 Iain Hornal – lead and backing vocals, rhythm guitar, percussion, keyboards (2018–present; substitute 2014–2018)

Discography

 10cc (1973)
 Sheet Music (1974)
 The Original Soundtrack (1975)
 How Dare You! (1976)
 Deceptive Bends (1977)
 Bloody Tourists (1978)
 Look Hear? (1980)
 Ten Out of 10 (1981)
 Windows in the Jungle (1983)
 ...Meanwhile (1992)
 Mirror Mirror (1995)

References

Further reading
 Thompson, Dave: The Cost of Living in Dreams – The 10cc Story. Create Space, 2012 
 Newton, Liam: The Worst Band In The World (2020)

External links

 Official website of the current 10cc touring band.
 
 Official 10cc fan club website
 10cc Myspace
 10cc from the Warner Bros. years at Webstarts
 10cc at WordPress
 10cc fan collector website
 Reviewed: 10cc Live in Birmingham UK at  Rocker Magazine
 The 'Consequences 10cc Podcast' dedicated to 10cc and Godley & Creme, with particular focus on their album 'Consequences'

 
English art rock groups
British soft rock music groups
Ivor Novello Award winners
Mercury Records artists
Musical groups from Cheshire
Music in the Metropolitan Borough of Stockport
Art pop groups
Progressive pop groups